In mathematics, the intersection of two or more objects is another object consisting of everything that is contained in all of the objects simultaneously. For example, in Euclidean geometry, when two lines in a plane are not parallel, their intersection is the point at which they meet. More generally, in set theory, the intersection of sets is defined to be the set of elements which belong to all of them. Unlike the Euclidean definition, this does not presume that the objects under consideration lie in a common space.

Intersection is one of the basic concepts of geometry. An intersection can have various geometric shapes, but a point is the most common in a plane geometry. Incidence geometry defines an intersection (usually, of flats) as an object of lower dimension that is incident to each of original objects. In this approach an intersection can be sometimes undefined, such as for parallel lines. In both cases the concept of intersection relies on logical conjunction. Algebraic geometry defines intersections in its own way with intersection theory.

Uniqueness
There can be more than one primitive object, such as points (pictured above), that form an intersection. The intersection can be viewed collectively as all of the shared objects (i.e., the intersection operation results in a set, possibly empty), or as several intersection objects (possibly zero).

In set theory 

The intersection of two sets A and B is the set of elements which are in both A and B.  Formally,

.

A more elaborate example (involving infinite sets) is:
 A = {x is an even integer}
 B = {x is an integer divisible by 3}
 

As another example, the number 5 is not contained in the intersection of the set of prime numbers {2, 3, 5, 7, 11, …} and the set of even numbers {2, 4, 6, 8, 10, …}, because although 5 is a prime number, it is not even. In fact, the number 2 is the only number in the intersection of these two sets. In this case, the intersection has mathematical meaning: the number 2 is the only even prime number.

In geometry

Notation

The symbol  was first used by Hermann Grassmann in Die Ausdehnungslehre von 1844 as general operation symbol, not specialized for intersection. From there, it was used by Giuseppe Peano (1858–1932) for intersection, in 1888 in Calcolo geometrico secondo l'Ausdehnungslehre di H. Grassmann.

Peano also created the large symbols for general intersection and union of more than two classes in his 1908 book Formulario mathematico.

See also
 Constructive solid geometry, Boolean Intersection is one of the ways of combining 2D/3D shapes
 Dimensionally Extended 9-Intersection Model
 Meet (lattice theory)
 Intersection (set theory)
 Union (set theory)

References

External links

zh-yue:交點
Broad-concept articles